Orlando António Fernandes da Costa (July 1929, Maputo − 27 January  2006) was a Portuguese writer of Goan paternal and Mozambican-French maternal descent whose writings express his experiences of life in Goa. According to Everton Machado, his book O Último Olhar de Manú Miranda is a good introduction to know Indo-Portuguese literature.  He was the father of current Portuguese Prime Minister Antonio Costa, by his first wife Maria Antónia Palla. 
Costa was maternal cousin to Sérgio Vieira, a politician in Mozambique.

After being raised in Margao (Goa), Costa spent in the 1950s, most of his time in the House of the Students of the Empire, an institution mainly built to house students from the colonies that were studying in the metropole. There, he came in contact with many of the future leaders of the nationalist movements of the colonies, such as the MPLA, the FRELIMO and the PAIGC. Between 1950 and 1953 he was arrested three times by the Salazar government.

Works
 1951 − A Estrada e a Voz
 1953 − Os Olhos sem Fronteira
 1955 − Sete Odes do Canto Comum
 1961 − O Signo da Ira
 1964 − Podem Chamar-me Eurídice
 1971 − Sem Flores nem Coroas
 1979 − Canto Civil
 1984 − A Como Estão os Cravos Hoje?
 1994 − Os Netos de Norton
 2000 − O Último Olhar de Manú Miranda

External References
Review of "O Signo da Ira" by Leopoldo da Rocha

References

1929 births
2006 deaths
People from Maputo
Portuguese people of Goan descent
Portuguese anti-fascists
Portuguese Communist Party politicians
Portuguese male writers
Portuguese politicians of Indian descent
Burials at Hollywood Forever Cemetery
People from Margao
Novelists from Goa
University of Lisbon alumni
Poets from Goa